Centro Sur (Spanish for "South-center") is a province of Equatorial Guinea. Its capital is Evinayong.

Geography

Centro Sur borders Gabon's Estuaire Province in the southwest and Woleu-Ntem Province in the southeast, and Cameroon's South Province in the north.  Domestically, it borders Kié-Ntem in the northeast, Wele-Nzas in the southeast, and Litoral in the west.

Centro Sur contains three main towns: Akurenam, Niefang and Evinayong.

References

 
Provinces of Equatorial Guinea